Kuklos Adelphon was a fraternity founded at the University of North Carolina in 1812. It was also known as old Kappa Alpha, K.A., Kappa Alpha, Circle of Brothers and the Alpha Society. Its name derives from Ancient Greek Κύκλος Ἀδελφών, meaning "Circle of Brothers." The organization quickly expanded throughout the Southern United States, not only on college campuses but also cities where alumni settled. The society began to decline during the 1850s and disappeared altogether after the Civil War.

The group was at its height, as far as its collegiate presence was concerned, by the spring of 1855, when local college politics at the University of Alabama caused a rift at its chapter there. A minority faction of the chapter disclosed the secrets of the order, leading to chapter dissolution, as well as chapters at other institutions. In 1858 the chapter at the University of South Carolina led a reorganization of the order and it was reconstituted as Phi Mu Omicron, but this order did not outlast the Civil War either. The last Kuklos Adelphon chapter proper, that at the University of North Carolina, dissolved in 1866.

John Lester, a founder of the Ku Klux Klan, claimed that the Klan's initiation ritual was based on a popular collegiate fraternal order, and it has been speculated by Allen Trelease that "Kuklos Adelphon almost certainly provided the model" for the early Klan.

References

Defunct fraternities and sororities
Fraternities and sororities in the United States
Organizations disestablished in the 1860s
Student organizations established in 1812
1812 establishments in North Carolina
University of North Carolina